Danil Ankudinov (born 31 July 2003) is a Kazakh footballer who plays as a forward for Van, on loan from Sheriff Tiraspol.

Career
As a youth player, Ankudinov joined the Spanish Marcet Football Academy. In 2021, he signed for Rodina-2 in the Russian fourth tier. Before the second half of 2021–22, he signed for Moldovan top flight club Sheriff. On 5 March 2022, Ankudinov debuted for Sheriff during a 2–0 win over Sfîntul Gheorghe.

On 22 February 2023, Ankudinov joined Armenian Premier League club Van on loan for the remainder of the season.

References

External links
 

2003 births
Association football forwards
Expatriate footballers in Moldova
Expatriate footballers in Russia
Expatriate footballers in Spain
FC Sheriff Tiraspol players
Kazakhstan youth international footballers
Kazakhstani expatriate footballers
Kazakhstani expatriate sportspeople in Moldova
Kazakhstani expatriate sportspeople in Russia
Kazakhstani expatriate sportspeople in Spain
Kazakhstani footballers
Living people
Moldovan Super Liga players